Jacqueline Cali-Pitts (born September 17, 1946) is an American politician in the state of New Hampshire. She is a member of the New Hampshire House of Representatives, sitting as a Democrat from the Rockingham 30 district, having been first elected in 1998.

References

1946 births
Living people
Politicians from New York City
Women state legislators in New Hampshire
Democratic Party members of the New Hampshire House of Representatives
People from Portsmouth, New Hampshire
University of New Hampshire alumni
20th-century American women politicians
21st-century American women politicians
20th-century American politicians
21st-century American politicians